Aditya Arya is a commercial and travel photographer. He began professional photography in 1980 after graduating in History from the St. Stephen’s College, Delhi University. 

He has played a pivotal role in the establishment of India Photo Archive Foundation and the Neel Dongre Awards/Grants for Excellence in Photography.

He has been on the Jury of the National Art Exhibition 2014 organised by Lalit Kala Akademi and many other national shows.

He  was a guest faculty at Sri Aurobindo Centre of Art and Communication and also previously at the Jamia Millia Islamia University’s Institute of Mass Communication. He was also a mentor at Habitat Photosphere, a photography festival initiative by Visual Arts Gallery, India Habitat Centre. He was also the Director at the Academy for Photographic Excellence (APEX), one of the India’s leading photography academies based in New Delhi, and a Guest Fellow and Curator at the Indian Institute of Advanced Study, Shimla.

Photography

Commercial photography
Arya is known for his work relating to hotel photography. He has worked with several hotels chains that includes covering hotels like the Radisson, Club Mahindra, and Oberoi group. He has covered these hotels all across India as well as abroad. He has also covered other areas in advertising such as food, industries and healthcare.

Discovering India
Aditya Arya has travelled extensively across the country and his work reflects this. He has worked across India to explore different regions in the country. He has worked in Nagaland with writer Vibha Joshi to cover the 16 remaining Naga tribes. His work focusing on the Buddhist art in the 900-year-old monastery in Alchi, Ladakh, and the Himalayas, was covered by the Smithsonian Magazine. He has also worked on the Musahar Community in Bihar. He has also covered landscapes in Ladakh and the Jal Mahal in Jaipur. Other than this, he has photographed the Khampti tribe in Arunachal Pradesh and a lot of rural India

Outside India
Arya worked in collaboration with the German Embassy to cover 'Germany through Indian eyes'

APEX
Aditya Arya is part of the faculty and advisory board at the Academy of Photographic Excellence or APEX. He was one of the founding members of the Academy.

Aditya Arya Archive, India Photo Archive Foundation and Kulwant Roy 
Aditya Arya is the owner of Aditya Arya Archive which contains rare photographic collections like that of Kulwant Roy. He was one of the founding member of the India Photo Archive Foundation and also the Chairman and Trustee there. He has been restoring and preserving these rare collections and providing them for viewing through publications and exhibitions. He most recently curated the exhibition titled Kulwant Roy: Retrospective at the National Gallery of Modern Art.

Publications

References

Indian art historians
20th-century Indian photographers
Living people
Indian art collectors
Year of birth missing (living people)
Place of birth missing (living people)